Law enforcement in Nicaragua falls under the jurisdiction of La Policia Nacional of Nicaragua. They are in charge of regular police functions and sometimes work in conjunction with the Nicaraguan military, making it an indirect and rather subtle version of a gendarmerie.

The Nicaraguan National Police work separately and have a different established set of norms than the nation's military.

Historical secret police organizations

Dirección General de Seguridad del Estado (DGSE) (Directorate-General of State Security)

See also
Nicaraguan National Police
National Guard of Nicaragua

References

Sources
 World Police Encyclopedia, ed. by Dilip K. Das & Michael Palmiotto.  by Taylor & Francis. 2004,  
 World Encyclopedia of Police Forces and Correctional Systems, 2nd.  edition,  Gale., 2006
 Sullivan, Larry E. et al.  Encyclopedia of Law Enforcement. Thousand Oaks: Sage Publications, 2005.